Teinolophos is a prehistoric species of monotreme, or egg-laying mammal, from the Teinolophidae. It is known from four specimens, each consisting of a partial lower jawbone collected from the Wonthaggi Formation at Flat Rocks, Victoria, Australia. It lived during the late Barremian age of the Lower Cretaceous.

The species name honours the artist Peter Trusler. The genus name, Teinolophos, means "extended ridge", a reference to its tooth structure.

Originally, Teinolophos was thought to be a eupantothere. Further research revealed similarities to Steropodon, except in size: the animal was around 10 cm long. It is often listed as a steropodontid, though it may be more basal. Teinolophos is deeply divergent within monotreme evolution, so in 2022 it was proposed to move  it into its own family, Teinolophidae. Stirtodon may be close relative of Steropodon within Teinolophidae.

The holotype is a partial left dentary known as NMV P208231. An age of approximately 123 million years makes this the earliest known monotreme. The lower molar is broadly similar in morphology to the m2 of Steropodon. The trigonid is compressed and the talonid has no basin. The dentary is about one sixth the size of Steropodon, and wear facets indicate an "orthal" occlusion with the upper molars.

Description

Jaw
The construction of the lower jaw differs from existing monotremes. Among the contrasts are the condyle, which is well above the tooth row (instead of at about the same height); and the ascending ramus, which is also higher. Also different is that Teinolophos probably had a strong bite. A unique feature for known toothed monotremes is that the trigonid is tall, while the talonid is set much lower. This is more like the general mammalian arrangement. The molar is double-rooted, which is plesiomorphic when compared to ornithorhynchids, but is a shared characteristic with Steropodon and Kollikodon. Subsequent monotreme molars are multi-rooted.

Unlike modern monotremes, Teinolophos lacked a beak.

Ears
Unlike modern monotremes, which have suspended ear bones much like placentals and marsupials, Teinolophos still had them connected to the jaw via the Meckel's cartilage. This reinforces the idea that the modern ear condition evolved independently among monotremes and therians.

Evolution
One study interpreted Teinolophos as a basal platypus.

See also

References

Bibliography 
 Rich et al. "Early Cretaceous Mammals from Flat Rocks, Victoria, Australia". Records of the Queen Victoria Museum, Launceston (1999).
 Rich, T. H., et al. "Monotreme nature of the Australian Early Cretaceous mammal Teinolophos". Acta Palaeontologica Polonica 46(1). 2001 Pages 113–118.
 Rowe, T., et al. "The oldest platypus and its bearing on divergence timing of the platypus and echidna clades". Proceedings of the National Academy of Sciences 105(4). 2008 Pages 1238–1242.

External links

 Life in the Shadows, Non-reptilian life in Mesozoic Australia
 Mesozoic Mammals: Monotremata, an Internet directory
 "Prehistoric jawbone reveals evolution repeating itself" 10 February 2005
 "The oldest platypus and its bearing on divergence timing of the platypus and echidna clades" 2008

Prehistoric monotremes
Prehistoric mammal genera
Aptian life
Cretaceous mammals of Australia
Fossils of Australia
Fossil taxa described in 1999
Taxa named by Tom Rich